The Florida Marlins' 1997 season was the fifth season for the Major League Baseball (MLB) franchise in the National League.  It would begin with the team attempting to improve on their season from 1996.  Their manager was Jim Leyland. They played home games at Pro Player Stadium. They finished with a record of 92-70, posting the first winning season in franchise history and winning the NL Wild Card. They got through the National League playoffs and won the World Series over the Cleveland Indians.

Offseason
 November 22, 1996: Bobby Bonilla was signed as a free agent with the Florida Marlins.
 March 26, 1997: Cliff Floyd was traded by the Montreal Expos to the Florida Marlins for Dustin Hermanson and Joe Orsulak.

Regular season

Season standings

Record vs. opponents

Transactions
 July 21, 1997: Darren Daulton was traded by the Philadelphia Phillies to the Florida Marlins for Billy McMillon.
 July 27, 1997: Craig Counsell was traded by the Colorado Rockies to the Florida Marlins for Mark Hutton.
July 29, 1997: Matt Treanor was traded by the Kansas City Royals to the Florida Marlins for Matt Whisenant.

Roster

Player stats

Batting

Starters by position 
Note: Pos = Position; G = Games played; AB = At bats; R = Runs scored; H = Hits; Avg. = Batting average; HR = Home runs; RBI = Runs batted in; SB = Stolen bases

Other batters 
Note: G = Games played; AB = At bats; R = Runs scored; H = Hits; Avg. = Batting average; HR = Home runs; RBI = Runs batted in; SB = Stolen bases

Pitching

Starting pitchers
Note: G = Games pitched; GS = Games started; IP = Innings pitched; W = Wins; L = Losses; ERA = Earned run average; SO = Strikeouts

Other pitchers 
Note: G = Games pitched; IP = Innings pitched; W = Wins; L = Losses; ERA = Earned run average; SO = Strikeouts

Relief pitchers 
Note: G = Games pitched; W = Wins; L = Losses; SV = Saves; ERA = Earned run average; SO = Strikeouts

Postseason

NLDS 

Florida wins the series, 3-0

NLCS

World Series

Game 1
October 18, 1997, at Pro Player Stadium in Miami

Game 2
October 19, 1997, at Pro Player Stadium in Miami

Game 3
October 21, 1997, at Jacobs Field in Cleveland, Ohio

Game 4
October 22, 1997, at Jacobs Field in Cleveland, Ohio

Game 5
October 23, 1997, at Jacobs Field in Cleveland, Ohio

Game 6
October 25, 1997, at Pro Player Stadium in Miami

Game 7
October 26, 1997, at Pro Player Stadium in Miami

Awards and honors
 Darren Daulton, National League Comeback Player of the Year
 Liván Hernández, NLCS MVP
 Liván Hernández, World Series MVP
1997 Major League Baseball All-Star Game
Moisés Alou, reserve
Kevin Brown, reserve
Charles Johnson, reserve

Farm system

References

External links
1997 Marlins at Baseball Reference
1997 Florida Marlins at Baseball Almanac

Miami Marlins seasons
Florida Marlins season
National League champion seasons
World Series champion seasons
Miami Marl